Winchester Municipal Airport  is a city-owned public-use airport located three nautical miles (6 km) southeast of the central business district of Winchester, a city in Franklin County, Tennessee, United States.

Although most U.S. airports use the same three-letter location identifier for the FAA and IATA, this airport is assigned BGF by the FAA but has no designation from the IATA (which assigned BGF to Bangui M'Poko International Airport in Bangui, Central African Republic).

Facilities and aircraft 
It has one asphalt paved runway designated 18/36 which measures 5,002 by 75 feet (1,525 x 23 m).

For the 12-month period ending June 30, 2022, the airport had 13,000 aircraft operations, an average of 14 per day: 92% general aviation, 6% air taxi and 2% military. At that time there were 21 aircraft based at this airport: 17 single-engine, 3 multi-engine, 1 helicopter and 0 jet.

Accidents and incidents 
 On February 7, 2021, a Cessna 441 Conquest II (2), registration N44776, crashed while approaching Winchester Municipal Airport, killing both people on board, the pilot and passenger. The cause is still under investigation.

References

External links 
 Winchester Municipal Airport
 
 

Airports in Tennessee
Buildings and structures in Franklin County, Tennessee
Transportation in Franklin County, Tennessee
Winchester, Tennessee